Arthur Wellesley French Jr. (November 6, 1931 – July 24, 2021) was an American actor and director, best known for his work in the theatre.

Life and career

French was born in Harlem, New York City, on November 6, 1931, the son of Arthur and Ursilla French, who both emigrated to the U.S. from Saint Vincent and the Grenadines.

Throughout a career that spans over fifty years, French is best known for his work on the stage. He worked extensively with the Negro Ensemble Company (NEC) and has played a wide variety of roles. He was also a supporting character in the 1976 comedy film Car Wash.

His later film credits were in 2 Days in New York and Red Hook Summer, both released in August 2012. He died on July 24, 2021, at the age of 89 in Manhattan, New York.

Selected credits

Theatre

Acting

Directing

Film

Acting

Television

Acting

References

External links

 
Arthur French at the Internet Theatre Database

1931 births
2021 deaths
Male actors from New York (state)
African-American male actors
American male film actors
American people of Saint Vincent and the Grenadines descent
American male stage actors
American male television actors
20th-century African-American people
21st-century African-American people